Bedford Community School District is a rural public school district headquartered in Bedford, Iowa.  The district operates Bedford Elementary School and Bedford High School.

It is mostly in Taylor County with portions in Ringgold and Page counties. Communities served include Bedford, Blockton, Conway, Gravity, and a portion of New Market.

On July 1, 2008, the district absorbed portions of the former New Market Community School District. When the Clearfield Community School District closed on July 1, 2014, the Bedford district absorbed a portion of it.

Schools
The district operates two schools in a single facility in Bedford.
Bedford Elementary School
Bedford High School

See also
List of school districts in Iowa

References

External links
 Bedford Community School District

School districts in Iowa
Education in Taylor County, Iowa
Education in Page County, Iowa
Education in Ringgold County, Iowa